The 1970–71 Algerian Championnat National was the ninth season of the Algerian Championnat National since its establishment in 1962. A total of 16 teams contested the league, with CR Belcourt as the defending champions, The Championnat started on September 20, 1970. and ended on April 25, 1971.

Team summaries

Promotion and relegation 
Teams promoted from Algerian Division 2 1970-1971 
 MO Constantine
 ASM Oran
 Hamra Annaba
 WA Tlemcen

Teams relegated to Algerian Division 2 1971-1972
 No relegated

League table

Season statistics

Top scorers

References

External links
1970–71 Algerian Championnat National

Algerian Ligue Professionnelle 1 seasons
1970–71 in Algerian football
Algeria